Saint-François is a civil parish in Madawaska County, New Brunswick, Canada.

For governance purposes it is part of the incorporated rural community of Haut-Madawaska, which is a member of the Northwest Regional Service Commission (NWRSC).

Origin of name
The parish takes its name from the St. Francis River.

History
Saint-François was erected as Saint Francis in 1850 from Madawaska Parish.

In 1852 the parish was expanded northward to include territory award in the boundary settlement with Canada.

In 1877 the eastern part of Saint-François was included in the newly erected Saint-Hilaire Parish.

In 1900 Clair Parish was erected from the eastern part of Saint-François.

In 1946 the name was changed to Saint Francois and the boundaries were affected by the major reorganisation of Madawaska County parish lines.

In 1973 the name was changed to Saint-François.

Boundaries
Saint-François Parish is bounded:

 on the northwest by the Quebec border;
 on the northeast and east, running mainly along grant lines, beginning on the provincial border at the westernmost corner of Range Three of the Baker Lake Settlement, then southeasterly along the southwestern line of Range Four to the northernmost corner of a grant in Range Four in Baker Lake Settlement, about 1.35 kilometres northwest of Chemin des Long, then southwesterly to the southwestern line of Range Four, then southeasterly along Range Four for about 2 kilometres to the northernmost corner of a grant in Range Five of Baker Brook Settlement, then southwesterly to the southwestern line of Range Five, then southeasterly to the northern line of Range Three north of the Saint John River, then easterly along Range Three to the prolongation of the western line of a grant to Edward Levasseur in Range Two north of the Saint John, located on the western side of the northern end of Levasseur Road, then southerly along the prolongation, the grant line, and the prolongation to the international border in the Saint John River;
 on the south and west by the international border within the Saint John River and Saint Francis River.

Communities
Communities at least partly within the parish. italics indicate a name no longer in official use; all communities are part of the incorporated rural community of Haut-Madawaska

 Concession-des-Bouchard
 Concession-des-Jaunes
 Concession-des-Viel
  Connors
  Lac-Unique
 Little River Mills
 Mouth of St. Francis
 Pelletiers Mill
  Saint-François-de-Madawaska
 Val Oakes

Bodies of water
Bodies of water at least partly in the parish.

 Crocs River
 Saint-François River
  Saint John River
 Mill Stream
 Lac à Landry
 Cross Lake
 Glasier Lake
 Mud Lake
 Rocky Brook Lakes
 Lac Unique

Islands
Islands at least partly in the parish.

 Arsenault Island
 Cranberry Island
 Crock Island
 Foley Island
 Hafey Island
 Kennedy Island

Other notable places
Parks, historic sites, and other noteworthy places at least partly in the parish.
 Foley Island Protected Natural Area
 Glazier Lake Protected Natural Area
 Grew Brook Protected Natural Area

Demographics
Parish population total does not include Saint-François-de-Madawaska

Population

Language

See also
Crocs River, a stream
List of parishes in New Brunswick

Notes

References

Parishes of Madawaska County, New Brunswick